Derrick Ward (23 December 1934 – 11 October 2011) was a footballer who played in the Football League for Stockport County and Stoke City. He made fifty four appearances for Stoke.

Career
Born in Stoke-on-Trent Ward started his career at his local club Stoke City where he made his debut in the 1952–53 season.  He was a bit part player at Stoke due Frank Bowyer and Bobby Howitt occupying Ward's position.  He became more involved with the first team in the 1958–59 season where he made 17 appearances however he was allowed by manager Tony Waddington to join Stockport County in 1961.  Ward went on to spend three years at Edgeley Park making 81 league appearances scoring 21 goals.

Personal life
His brother Terry was also a footballer who played for Stoke he however died when he was 23. Ward died on 11 October 2011 at the age of 76.

Career statistics

References

1934 births
2011 deaths
Footballers from Stoke-on-Trent
English footballers
Stoke City F.C. players
Stockport County F.C. players
English Football League players
Association football forwards